Blaydon is a constituency represented in the House of Commons since 2017 by Liz Twist of the Labour Party.

Constituency profile
The seat has been a safe seat for the Labour Party since 1935.

Historically the area's economy relied on coal mining from the Victorian period until the decline of mining in the latter half of the 20th century.

Today the economy is supported by engineering and service industries on Tyneside, and agriculture. It also includes the Metrocentre, the second-largest shopping centre in the UK. 

The constituency is on the western upland outskirts of Gateshead and its communities are separated by green buffers. It currently comprises the towns of Blaydon, Whickham, Ryton, Birtley and surrounding villages in the south and west of the Metropolitan Borough of Gateshead.

Boundaries

1918–1950 

 The Urban Districts of Blaydon, Ryton, Tanfield, and Whickham.

Blaydon was created under the Representation of the People Act 1918 for the 1918 general election when Blaydon, Ryton and Whickham were split off from the existing Chester-le-Street seat. Tanfield was added from the abolished constituency of North West Durham.

1950–1983 

 The Urban Districts of Blaydon, Ryton, and Whickham.

Tanfield transferred to Consett.

1983–2010 

 The Borough of Gateshead wards of Birtley, Blaydon, Chopwell and Rowlands Gill, Crawcrook and Greenside, Lamesley, Ryton, Whickham North, Whickham South, and Winlaton.

The communities of Birtley and Lamesley were transferred in from the abolished constituency of Chester-le-Street. Lost small area in the east of the seat to the new constituency of Tyne Bridge.

2010–present 

 The Borough of Gateshead wards of Birtley, Blaydon, Chopwell and Rowlands Gill, Crawcrook and Greenside, Dunston Hill and Whickham East, Lamesley, Ryton, Crookhill and Stella, Whickham North, Whickham South and Sunniside, and Winlaton and High Spen.

Minor changes resulting from the redrawing of ward boundaries in Gateshead Borough and abolition of Tyne Bridge.

Members of Parliament

Elections

Elections in the 2010s

Elections in the 2000s

Elections in the 1990s

Elections in the 1980s

Elections in the 1970s

Elections in the 1960s

Elections in the 1950s

Election in the 1940s

Elections in the 1930s

Elections in the 1920s

Elections in the 1910s

See also
List of parliamentary constituencies in Tyne and Wear
History of parliamentary constituencies and boundaries in Tyne and Wear
History of parliamentary constituencies and boundaries in Durham

Notes

References

External links 
nomis Constituency Profile for Blaydon, presenting data from the ONS annual population survey and other official statistics

Constituencies of the Parliament of the United Kingdom established in 1918
Parliamentary constituencies in Tyne and Wear
Politics of Gateshead